Garreg Lwyd is a hill in Mid Wales, between the towns of Rhayader and Llangurig. It rises to the east above the A470 as it follows the Wye Valley. The Bryn Titli Wind Farm is situated on an area of flatter moorland to the north-west. Red kites frequent the area.

Marilyns of Wales
Mountains and hills of Powys